is a Japanese politician serving in the House of Representatives in the Diet (national legislature) as a member of the Liberal Democratic Party. A native of Kawagoe, Saitama and graduate of Meiji University he was elected to the Diet for the first time in 1996 after serving in local assemblies in Saitama Prefecture for years.

References

External links 
  in Japanese.

1936 births
Living people
Politicians from Saitama Prefecture
Members of the House of Representatives (Japan)
Liberal Democratic Party (Japan) politicians
21st-century Japanese politicians